High Park—Humber Valley was a federal electoral district in the west-end of the old Metropolitan Toronto, in Ontario, Canada. It was represented in the House of Commons from 1972 to 1979. It was created in 1972 from the High Park district, maintaining the same boundaries as the former district. It was abolished in 1976, but the next election did not occur until almost three-years later. Its only Member of Parliament was Otto Jelinek.

History

The federal riding was created in 1972 from the former High Park electoral district. It more or less contained the same boundaries as the former High Park riding.  S.C. 1972, c.4 paragraph 25 of the Electoral Boundaries Readjustment Act substitute the word: "HIGH PARK", with the words: "HIGH PARK-HUMBER VALLEY" as the name of the district, with the same borders as the previously named one.

It was defined to consist of the part of Metropolitan Toronto bounded on the south by Lake Ontario, and on the east, north and west by a line drawn north along Parkside Drive, west along Bloor Street West, north on Pacific Avenue, east along Canadian Pacific Railway, north along Keele Street, west along Rogers Road, northwest along Weston Road, west along Black Creek, south along Jane Street, southwest along Dundas Street, southeast along Mimico Creek, east along The Queensway, and southeast along the Humber River to the shore of Lake Ontario.

The electoral district was abolished in 1976 when it was redistributed between Davenport, Etobicoke Centre, Parkdale—High Park and Etobicoke—Lakeshore ridings.

Members of Parliament

This riding has elected the following Members of Parliament:

Federal election results

|}

|}

See also 

 List of Canadian federal electoral districts
 Past Canadian electoral districts

References

Former federal electoral districts of Ontario
Federal electoral districts of Toronto